David Shanks was the twelfth Chief Censor of New Zealand. He was appointed on 8 May 2017 for a three-year term, replacing the previous Chief Censor Andrew Jack.

On 8 May 2020 Shanks was reappointed for a two-year term concluding on 6 May 2022. He was succeeded by Caroline Flora, who is the current Chief Censor of New Zealand, on 20 July 2022.

References 

Chief Censors of New Zealand
Year of birth missing (living people)
Living people